George Haliburton or Halliburton or Halyburton may refer to:

 George Haliburton (bishop of Aberdeen) (–1715)
 George Haliburton (bishop of Dunkeld) (1616–1665)
 George Haliburton, 4th Lord Haliburton of Dirleton (died before 1492), Scottish Lord of Parliament
 George Haliburton, Lord Fodderance (-1649), Scottish judge and Senator of the College of Justice
 George Halliburton (–1826), Argentine naval officer